L'Anse is a village and the county seat of Baraga County, Michigan. The population was 1,874 at the 2020 census. The village is located within L'Anse Township in the Upper Peninsula, and partially inside the L'Anse Indian Reservation.

History
This area was long occupied by people of the Lake Superior Band of Ojibwa (Chippewa). Much later, French colonists had established a fur trading post here as a part of New France and a Jesuit mission, naming it L'Anse. In French, L'Anse translates as "the cove" or "the bay", a reference to its location in on the southern portion of L'Anse Bay, a portion of the larger Keweenaw Bay, at the base of the Keweenaw Peninsula. The modern-day village grew around this French trading post.

Following treaties with the United States in the 19th century, the Ojibwa/Chippewa ceded extensive amounts of land in Michigan. The L'Anse Indian Reservation was established by the U.S. here as the largest and the oldest in Michigan.

In 1896, the village was completely burned to the ground by a deadly fire which left many homeless.

Geography

Attractions 

 The L'Anse Waterfront Park on Baraga Avenue within the downtown area is a nice and scenic location to rest.
 The Falls River Falls in downtown L'Anse is a very long series of cascading falls that spans the entire width of the Falls River.

Transportation
  runs through the southernmost portion of the village.
  begins in the Village of Baraga, across the bay from L'Anse.
The bus line Indian Trails operates daily intercity bus service between Hancock, Michigan, and Milwaukee, Wisconsin, with a stop in L'Anse.

Demographics

2020 census
As of the census of 2020, the population was 1,874. The racial makeup of the village was 85.6% White, 5.8% Native American, 0.5% Asian, 0.2% Black or African American, 0.1% Pacific Islander, 0.4% from other races, and 7.5% from two or more races. Ethnically, the population was 0.8% Hispanic or Latino of any race.

2010 census
At the 2010 census, there were 2,011 people, 874 households and 502 families living in the village. The racial makeup of the village was 88.7% White, 1.4% African American, 5.0% Native American, 0.2% Asian, 0.1% from other races, and 4.6% from two or more races. Hispanic or Latino of any race were 0.9% of the population.

There were 874 households, of which 28.1% had children under the age of 18 living with them, 40.0% were married couples living together, 12.2% had a female householder with no husband present, 5.1% had a male householder with no wife present, and 42.6% were non-families. 37.9% of all households were made up of individuals, and 16.4% had someone living alone who was 65 years of age or older. The average household size was 2.16 and the average family size was 2.82.

The median age was 41.7 years. 22.9% of residents were under the age of 18; 6.8% were between the ages of 18 and 24; 24.3% were from 25 to 44; 24.1% were from 45 to 64; and 21.8% were 65 years of age or older. The gender makeup of the village was 47.6% male and 52.4% female.

2000 census
At the 2000 census, there were 2,107 people, 894 households and 540 families living in the village. The racial makeup of the village was 91.22% White, 0.09% African American, 5.55% Native American, 0.19% Asian, 0.05% Pacific Islander, and 2.90% from two or more races. Hispanic or Latino of any race were 0.57% of the population. 27.9% were of Finnish, 11.6% German, 9.4% French, 7.5% Norwegian, 5.9% French Canadian and 5.1% English ancestry according to Census 2000.

There were 894 households, of which 25.6% had children under the age of 18 living with them, 46.4% were married couples living together, 9.8% had a female householder with no husband present, and 39.5% were non-families. 34.2% of all households were made up of individuals, and 16.2% had someone living alone who was 65 years of age or older. The average household size was 2.23 and the average family size was 2.86.

21.3% of the population were under the age of 18, 7.3% from 18 to 24, 25.6% from 25 to 44, 23.9% from 45 to 64, and 21.9% who were 65 years of age or older. The median age was 42 years. For every 100 females, there were 88.8 males. For every 100 females age 18 and over, there were 87.3 males.

The median household income was $31,406 and the median family income was $38,984. Males had a median income of $31,583 and females $20,929. The per capita income was $15,857. About 6.6% of families and 11.0% of the population were below the poverty line, including 14.6% of those under age 18 and 6.1% of those age 65 or over.

Notable people
 Trevor Uren, Social Media Star and Businessman - Founder of ProSportsExtra

Images

References

Further reading

External links

 Village of L'anse official Site
 The L'Anse Sentinel
 Ojibwa Tribe

Villages in Baraga County, Michigan
Villages in Michigan
County seats in Michigan
Michigan populated places on Lake Superior